The following is an overview of public housing estates in Sham Shui Po, Hong Kong, including Home Ownership Scheme (HOS), Private Sector Participation Scheme (PSPS), and Tenants Purchase Scheme (TPS) estates.

History

The site where Sham Shui Po Park, Lai Kok Estate, Lai On Estate and Dragon Centre are located were formerly the Sham Shui Po Barracks of the British Army between the 1910s to 1977. During World War II, the barrack was attacked by the Japanese Army and was used as a concentration camp during the Japanese occupation from 1941–45. After the war, the barracks were once again used by British Army until 1977, when they were closed. Part of the site became Lai Kok Estate in 1981, and Sham Shui Po Park in 1983, while another part was a refugee camp for Vietnamese boat people. In 1989, the refugee camp was closed and replaced by Lai On Estate and Dragon Centre in 1993 and 1994 respectively.

In 1992, the Sham Shui Po Ferry Pier terminated ferry service due to West Kowloon Reclamation Project. Fu Cheong Estate was built in 2001 on the site of the bus terminus of the former pier, located between Yen Chow Street and Tung Chau Street. In 1977, the sea outside Tung Chau Street was reclaimed, the ferry pier was relocated near the newly reclaimed land near Yen Chow Street in 1978, and Nam Cheong Estate was built in 1989 on land beyond the old ferry pier located at the junction of Pei Ho Street and Tung Chau Street.

Overview

Cronin Garden 

Cronin Garden is a Flat-for-Sale Scheme estates at the junction of Shun Ning Road, Po On Road and Pratas Street in Sham Shui Po. It has totally seven 13-storey blocks, built in 1995 and developed by the Hong Kong Housing Society.

It was built on the site of Sheung Li Uk Estate, the first estate built by the Hong Kong Housing Society, designed by Stanley Feltham, and completed in 1952.

Houses

Fu Cheong Estate

Fu Cheong Estate was built on reclaimed land of the southwest of Sham Shui Po near Nam Cheong station. Fu Cheong Estate was built in 2001, Fu Cheong Estate was constructed on the former site of the Sham Shui Po bus terminus. Its name, "Fu Cheong", comes from nearby Nam Cheong Estate and means "Wealthy and Prosperity" in Chinese language. It consists of 10 residential buildings and a shopping centre completed in 2001 and 2002.

Houses

Lai Kok Estate

Lai Kok Estate was built on reclaimed land of the west of Yen Chow Street, Sham Shui Po, located near Lai On Estate, Dragon Centre, and Cheung Sha Wan station. It consists of 8 residential blocks completed in 1981.

Houses

Lai On Estate

Lai On Estate is located near Lai Kok Estate, Dragon Centre, and Sham Shui Po station. It consists of 5 residential blocks completed in 1993.

Houses

Nam Cheong Estate

Nam Cheong Estate is named from nearby Nam Cheong Street, a main street in Sham Shui Po District. It consists of seven residential blocks completed in 1989. In 2005, the estate was sold to tenants through Tenants Purchase Scheme Phase 6B.

The estate is surrounded by Tung Chau Street Park.

Houses

Wing Cheong Estate

Wing Cheong Estate is composed of two Y-shaped blocks completed 2013, between Fu Cheong Estate and the West Kowloon Corridor, on Sai Chuen Road. It provides about 1500 public rental flats. The main contractor for the estate's construction was Paul Y Engineering.

To mitigate the noise nuisance of the adjacent West Kowloon Corridor, the flats facing this motorway are equipped with "acoustic balconies". The balcony parapet incorporates an inclined glass panel to deflect noise, and the walls and ceiling of the balconies are faced with sound-absorbing panels.

Houses

Yee Ching Court 

Yee Ching Court is a HOS court in Sham Shui Po, next to Lai Kok Estate, Lai On Estate and Dragon Centre. It has 3 blocks built in 1993.

Houses

Yee Kok Court 

Yee Kok Court is a HOS court in Sham Shui Po, next to Lai Kok Estate, Lai On Estate and Dragon Centre. It has 7 blocks built in 1981.

Houses

See also
 Public housing in Hong Kong
 List of public housing estates in Hong Kong

References

Sham Shui Po